The Ikarranggal language, or Ogh Ikarranggal (Ikaranggal, Ikarranggali), is an extinct Paman language of the Cape York Peninsula in Queensland, Australia. Like several languages in the area, it is often referred to as Gogo Mini (Kuku-Mini) 'good speech'.

References

Thaypan languages
Extinct languages of Queensland